K road may refer to:

 Karangahape Road, a street in Auckland, New Zealand
 K roads in Malaysia, roads in Kedah
 Kansas numbered route: See List of Kansas numbered highways
 Corridor K, part of the Appalachian Development Highway System